The Roswell Historic District, in Roswell, Georgia in Fulton County, was listed on the National Register of Historic Places in 1974.

The district is a  area roughly bounded by Big Creek, King and Dam Streets, and SW along New Marietta Hwy, in Roswell.

Structures in the district date from as early as 1837.

Willis Ball, from Connecticut, was builder and/or designer/architect of four buildings:  Primrose Cottage, Roswell Presbyterian Church, Bulloch Hall, Barrington Hall.

The district includes Bulloch Hall and Barrington Hall, both built in 1839, which were separately listed on the National Register in 1971. It includes Greek Revival architecture and Late Georgian architecture amongst its 28 contributing buildings and three contributing structures.  It also includes a contributing site, the Roswell town square.

Elements of the district are:
Bulloch Hall (1839) 
Barrington Hall (1839)
Roswell Town Square, described as "the Boston Common of this most southern of New England villages", which includes historic monuments
Mimosa Hall (1847), also known as Phoenix Hall, Greek Revival in style.  On 2017 "Places in Peril" watchlist of Georgia Trust for Historic Preservation.  It was built in 1840 for Roswell settler John Dunwoody, then rebuilt in 1847 after a fire.  It was named Mimosa Hall by later owner General A. J. Hansell. It was eventually purchased in 1916 by noted Georgia architect Neel Reid who designed renovations of the house and its gardens.  The house was purchased in 1947 by Granger Hansell, great-grandson of A. J. Hansell, and up to 2017 it had remained in the Hansell family.  In 2017 it was for sale, and the Georgia Trust was concerned its acreage might be developed, and was offering inducements for a new owner to preserve the house and property. On June 12, 2017, the Roswell city council voted to purchase the property. The sale went through in August 2017, and there were later plans for the mansion to be retrofitted to become the "nation's oldest 'net zero' home".

Holly Hill (built between 1842 and 1847). Raised Greek Revival house facing upon town square. Built c.1845.  Holly Hill was built as a summer home for Savannah cotton broker Robert Adams Lewis and his wife, Catherine Barrington Cook.  Also known as the Lewis Place, it was documented under that name by the Historic American Buildings Survey in 1936.
Primrose Cottage (c.1839), Mimosa Boulevard
various houses across from Primrose Cottage
Great Oaks (1842), Mimosa Boulevard, now a wedding venue, "The Gardens at Great Oaks"

Roswell Presbyterian Church (1840). The church was organized at Primrose Cottage in 1839.
stores on Atlantic St.

The Old Bricks, originally housing for Roswell Mills workers
Southern Mills building (1882), Mill St.  Per a sign on site, original mill destroyed by Sherman's men in 1864, rebuilt 1882, destroyed by lightning 1929, continued in operations to 1975.
Old Mill (c.1840), off Mill Street on Big Creek. Two-story brick building with brick cornice, late Georgian in style. This is "the last surviving physical remains of the original 1839 Roswell Manufacturing Company." Now the "Old Mill Park and Machine Shop"

See also
National Register of Historic Places listings in Fulton County, Georgia

References

External links

Historic districts on the National Register of Historic Places in Georgia (U.S. state)
National Register of Historic Places in Fulton County, Georgia